CGI may refer to:

Technology
 Computer-generated imagery, computer-graphic effects in films, television programs, and other visual media
 Computer Graphics Interface, the low-level interface between the Graphical Kernel System and hardware
 Common Gateway Interface, a standard for dynamic generation of web pages by a web server
 CGI.pm, a Perl module for implementing Common Gateway Interface programs
 Compacted graphite iron, a type of cast iron
 Corrugated galvanised iron, a type of molded sheet metal
 Cell Global Identity, a standard identifier for mobile phone cells

Organizations
 California Graduate Institute, an independent graduate school specializing in psychology
 Catholic Guides of Ireland, a Girl Guide association
 Chulabhorn Graduate Institute, a private graduate institute in Thailand
 CGI Aero or RusAir, a Russian airline
CGI Inc., a multinational information technology and business process services company
 Clinton Global Initiative, a forum created by former US President Bill Clinton to discuss global problems
 Coast Guard Intelligence, the intelligence branch of the United States Coast Guard
 Commission for the Management and Application of Geoscience Information
 Compagnie Générale Immobiliere, a Moroccan real-estate development company
 Consultative Group on Indonesia, a former consortium of donors to the Indonesian government
 Cuerpo Guardia de Infantería, an Argentine police riot control service

Other uses
 Clinical global impression, a family of scales to assess treatment response associated with mental disorders
 Cognitively Guided Instruction, an approach to mathematics teaching and learning
 CpG islands, in genetics, genomic regions that contain a high frequency of CG dinucleotides
 Cape Girardeau Regional Airport (IATA airport code: CGI), an airport in Missouri, US

See also